St. Bede's Catholic High School is a Roman Catholic, co-educational secondary school located on St. Anne's Road, Ormskirk, Lancashire, North West England. As a Catholic community school, it gives priority to parishioners' children and those living within the LEA.

The current headteacher is Mr P Denton, who replaced Mr Chris Horrocks in 2018.

References

External links 
 St. Bede's Catholic High School website

Schools in the Borough of West Lancashire
Catholic secondary schools in the Archdiocese of Liverpool
Secondary schools in Lancashire
Voluntary aided schools in England
Ormskirk